The 2015 Úrvalsdeild karla, also known as Pepsi-deild karla for sponsorship reasons, was the 104th season of top-flight Icelandic football. Twelve teams contested the league; the defending champions were Stjarnan, who had won their first ever league title in 2014 going unbeaten in the league.

On 26 September FH were crowned champions after a 2–1 win over Fjölnir with one game to spare. This was FH's 7th league title.

Keflavík and Leiknir R were relegated from the league. Keflavík had been in the league since 2004 but this was Leiknir R's first ever season in the top flight.

The season started on 3 May 2015 and was conclude on 4 October 2015.

Teams

A total of 12 teams contested the league. 10 teams from the 2014 season and the 2 promoted teams from 2014 1. deild karla. On 4 September 2014 both Leiknir R. and ÍA earned promotion from 1. deild, they replaced the relegated teams Fram and Þór.

Club information

Kit manufacturer and sponsors

Managerial Changes

 1Ólafur Þórðarson and Miloš Milojević will co-head coach Víkingur next season. Miloš Milojević took over as sole head coach after Ólafur Þórðarson's departure on 15 July.
2Ásmundur Arnarson took over as an interim manager of ÍBV until the end of the season after Jóhannes Harðarson got a leave of absence because of personal issues.

League table

Positions by round

Results

Season Statistics

Top Scorers

First goal: 1. round – 23rd minute
Ólafur Karl Finsen for Stjarnan against ÍA on 3 May 2015
Last goal: 22. round – 90+5 minute
Andri Rafn Yeoman for Breiðablik against Fjölnir on 3 October 2015
Fastest goal: 17 seconds
Rolf Toft for Víkingur R against Stjarnan on 20 May 2015
Most goals in a single match: 3
 Steven Lennon for FH against Leiknir R on 31 May 2015
 Kristján Flóki Finnbogason for FH against ÍBV on 14 June 2015
 Jonathan Glenn for Breiðablik against ÍA on 17 August 2015
 Guðjón Baldvinsson for Stjarnan against Keflavík on 26 September 2015

Clean Sheets

 Most clean sheets by club: 12
 Breiðablik
 Fewest clean sheets by club: 0
 Keflavík

Discipline

Yellow Cards

 Most yellow cards by club: 55
 Keflavík

Red Cards

 Most red cards by club: 4
 Stjarnan

Awards

Player of the Year
The player of the season was awarded to Emil Pálsson who played for both Fjölnir and FH during the season.

Young Player of the Year
The young player of the year was awarded to Breiðablik's winger Höskuldur Gunnlaugsson.

Golden Boot
Patrick Pedersen was awarded the golden boot after scoring 13 goals in 20 games (4 penalties)Jonathan Glenn was awarded the silver boot after scoring 12 goals in 20 games (2 penalties)Garðar Gunnlaugsson was awarded the bronze boot after scoring 9 goals in 17 games (0 penalties)

Referee of the year
Gunnar Jarl Jónsson was voted the referee of the year by Úrvalsdeild players.

Player of the Round

References

External links

Úrvalsdeild karla (football) seasons
1
Iceland
Iceland